War zone or warzone may refer to a zone of war, or to:

Film and television
 The War Zone, a 1999 film starring Ray Winstone
 War Zone (film), a 1998 documentary about street harassment directed by Maggie Hadleigh-West
 "War Zone" (Angel), a 2000 episode of the television series Angel 
 "War Zone" (Crusade), the pilot episode of the television series Crusade
 Punisher: War Zone, a 2008 film based on the Marvel comic book series The Punisher War Zone
 War Zone, the second hour of the WWF's weekly show Raw is War from 1997-2001

Games
 Call of Duty: Warzone, a 2020 battle royale video game, spinoff of the 2019 game Call of Duty: Modern Warfare
Warzone 2100, a hybrid real-time strategy/tactics game
Warzone (game), a table-top miniatures game
 WWF War Zone, a 1998 video game, based on the TV show of the same name

Music
 Warzone Collective, an anarchopunk venue in Belfast
 War Zone (album), a 1999 album by hip hop group Black Moon
 Warzone (Jungle Rot album), 2006
 Warzone (Yoko Ono album), 2018
 In a Warzone, a 2013 album by the punk rock/rap rock band Transplants
 Warzone (band), a New York skinhead band
 War Zone (group), a rap group consisting of Goldie Loc, MC Eiht & Kam

Songs
 "War Zone" (Punisher: War Zone), theme song for the 2008 film Punisher: War Zone by Rob Zombie
 "Warzone" (song), a song by British pop band The Wanted
 "War Zone", a song by Slayer from their 2001 album God Hates Us All
 "Warzone", a 1990 song by Skrewdriver
 "Warzone", a song by Pagoda
 "Warzone" (Pete Rock song), on the 2004 album Soul Survivor II

See also
 Combat Zone (disambiguation)
 Hot zone (disambiguation)